The 1951 Japan Series was the Nippon Professional Baseball (NPB) championship series for the 1951 season. It was the second Japan Series and featured the Pacific League champions, the Nankai Hawks, against the Central League champions, the Yomiuri Giants.

Summary

Matchups

Game 1
Wednesday, October 10, 1951 – 2:02 pm at Osaka Stadium in Osaka, Osaka Prefecture

Game 2
Thursday, October 11, 1951 – 2:01 pm at Osaka Stadium in Osaka, Osaka Prefecture

Game 3
Saturday, October 13, 1951 – 2:00 pm at Korakuen Stadium in Bunkyo, Tokyo

Game 4
Tuesday, October 16, 1951 – 2:00 pm at Korakuen Stadium in Bunkyo, Tokyo

Game 5
Wednesday, October 17, 1951 – 2:03 pm at Korakuen Stadium in Bunkyo, Tokyo

See also
1951 World Series

References

Japan Series
Japan Series
Japan Series
Japan series